Triquetrum may refer to:
 triquetrum (astronomy), an ancient astronomical instrument
 The triquetral bone in the human wrist